Kanding Station may refer to two stations in Taiwan:
 Kanding railway station in Kanding, Pingtung
 Kanding light rail station in Tamsui, New Taipei